William Zuckert (December 18, 1915 – January 23, 1997) was an American actor.

Life / Career 
Born and raised in The Bronx, New York, Zuckert began his career in 1941 in radio and lent his voice to hundreds of dramas over the next two decades.

He served in World War II as a member of the naval construction force known as the Seabees.

On old-time radio, Zuckert portrayed Lieutenant Louis Parker in the NBC crime drama Crime and Peter Chambers. He went on to star in television, having many guest and character roles over the next half century, such as playing the sheriff in the Star Trek episode, "Spectre of the Gun". He appeared in two episodes of the short-lived 1961 James Franciscus series The Investigators and also made four appearances on TV's Perry Mason as Judge Edward Simpson. 

In 1963, he appeared on Gunsmoke as “Enoch” in the episode “I Call Him Wonder” (S8E28), then again in 1965 as “Mr. Jacobson” in the episode “Deputy Festus” (S10E17).

In 1969 Zuckert appeared as Yaekima on the TV series The Virginian in the episode titled "A Woman of Stone".

Zuckert's Broadway credits include The Gang's All Here (1959) and Sixth Finger in a Five Finger Glove (1956).

Zuckert served on the boards of directors of two professional organizations: the Screen Actors Guild and the American Federation of Television and Radio Artists.

Personal life 
For 30 years Zuckert was married to actress Gladys Holland, who survived him. They had a daughter, and he had two children from a previous marriage.

Death 
On January 23, 1997, Zuckert died of pneumonia at the Motion Picture & Television Country House and Hospital in Woodland Hills, California.

Selected filmography 

Kiss of Death (1947) – Sing Sing Guard (uncredited)
Odds Against Tomorrow (1959) – Bartender (uncredited)
Ada (1961) – Harry Davers
Bachelor in Paradise (1961) – W.P. Mathews – Assistant Commissioner (uncredited)
Black Gold (1962) – Sheriff (uncredited)
Kid Galahad (1962) – O'Grady (uncredited)
Shock Corridor (1963) – 'Swaneee' Swanson
Robin and the 7 Hoods (1964) – Jury Foreman (uncredited)
The Cincinnati Kid (1965) – Poker Player (uncredited)
The Invaders (1967) – Sergeant
Hang 'em High (1968) – Sheriff
The Trouble with Girls (1969) – Mayor Gilchrist
The Gypsy Moths (1969) – Magistrate (uncredited)
The Great Bank Robbery (1969) – Ranger Commander
The Comic (1969) – Prison Warden in Film (uncredited)
Tora! Tora! Tora! (1970) – Admiral James O. Richardson (uncredited)
How to Frame a Figg (1971) – Commissioner Henders
Scandalous John (1971) – Abernathy
Family Flight (1972, TV Movie) – Frank Gross
The Girl Most Likely to... (1973) – Priest in funeral
Blazing Saddles (1974) – Official (uncredited)
The Sky's the Limit (1975) – Police Chief
The Strongest Man in the World (1975) – Policeman
W.C. Fields and Me (1976) – Studio Guard (uncredited)
Lipstick (1976) – Apartment Manager
F.I.S.T. (1978) – Delegate Bob
Loose Shoes (1978) – Hotel Detective
Born Again (1980) – E. Howard Hunt
Hangar 18 (1980) – Ace Landon
Seems Like Old Times (1980) – Gas Station Attendant
Chattanooga Choo Choo (1984) – Owen Meredith (uncredited)
Snowballing (1984) – Sheriff Gilliam
Little Treasure (1985) – Charlie Parker
Under the Gun (1988) – Guard
Critters 3 (1991) – Mr. Menges
Bank Robber (1993) – Old Man
Ace Ventura: Pet Detective (1994) – Mr. Finkle
Naked Gun : The Final Insult (1994) – Old Man

References

External links 

Old Time Radio Researchers Database of People and Programs 

1915 births
1997 deaths
20th-century American male actors
American male film actors
American male radio actors
American male television actors
United States Navy personnel of World War II
Deaths from pneumonia in California
Entertainers from the Bronx
Male actors from New York City
Seabees